Vitalades is a village and a community in the southwestern part of the island of Corfu. It is part of the municipal unit of Lefkimmi. In 2011 its population was 442 for the village and 524 for the community, which includes the village Gardenos. Vitalades is one of several villages on the island that have the suffix -ades, e.g. Argyrades.

Population

See also

List of settlements in the Corfu regional unit

External links
 Vitalades GTP Travel Pages

References

Populated places in Corfu (regional unit)
Lefkimmi